Giant Sand is an American musical group from Tucson, Arizona, United States. Its most constant member is singer-songwriter Howe Gelb. The group started as Giant Sandworms in the late 1970s post-punk and paisley underground scenes. They later shortened their name and developed an idiosyncratic sound rooted in alternative country, but touching on a wide range of other styles and featuring Gelb's beatnik-influenced vocals and songwriting. Since about 2012, they have also performed as Giant Giant Sand when featuring a larger ensemble than their traditional four to six musicians.

Members have included keyboardist Chris Cacavas (of Green on Red), bassist Paula Jean Brown (who was briefly a member of The Go-Go's and was married to Gelb at the time), Mark Walton (of The Dream Syndicate and Continental Drifters), drummer Tom Larkins (later to become a Jonathan Richman sideman), and Iain Shedden, drummer with Australian band The Saints. For a long while the band's rhythm section consisted of John Convertino and Joey Burns (of Calexico fame). In the early 2000s Howe Gelb reinvented the band again – this time with players from Denmark.

Guest artists over the last three decades have included Victoria Williams, Neko Case, Juliana Hatfield, PJ Harvey, Vic Chesnutt, Steve Wynn, Vicki Peterson, Rainer Ptacek, M. Ward, Isobel Campbell, nearly all members of the band Poi Dog Pondering, and Indiosa Patsy Jean (Gelb and Brown's daughter).

Discography

Giant Sand 
 1985: Valley of Rain (Enigma Records)
 1986: Ballad of a Thin Line Man (Zippo)
 1988: The Love Songs (Homestead)
 1988: Storm (What Goes On)
 1988: Long Stem Rant (Homestead)
 1989: Giant Sandwich (Homestead)
 1990: Swerve (Demon)
 1991: Ramp (Restless/Rough Trade)
 1992: Center of the Universe (Restless)
 1994 Stromausfall (Return to Sender)
 1993: Purge & Slouch (Brake Out)
 1994: Glum (Imago)
 1995: Goods and Services (Brake Out)
 1995: Backyard Barbecue Broadcast (Koch)
 1997: Official Bootleg Series Volume 1: Build Your Own Night It's Easy (¡Epiphany!)
 2000: Chore of Enchantment (Loose)
 2000: Official Bootleg Series Volume 2: The Rock Opera Years (OW OM Finished Recorded Products)
 2001: Official Bootleg Series Volume 3: Unsungglum (OW OM Finished Recorded Products)
 2001: Selections Circa 1990–2000 (V2 Records Benelux)
 2002: Cover Magazine (Thrill Jockey)
 2002: Infiltration of Dreams (Mucchio Extra)
 2003: Official Bootleg Series Volume 5: Too Many Spare Parts in the Yard Too Close at Hand (OW OM Recorded Products)
 2004: Is All Over the Map (Thrill Jockey)
 2008: *proVISIONS* (Thrill Jockey)
 2008: Provisional Supplement (OW OM Recorded Products)
 2010: Blurry Blue Mountain (Fire)
 2015: Heartbreak Pass (New West)
 2018: Returns To Valley Of Rain (Fire)
 2019: Recounting The Ballads Of Thin Line Men (Fire)

Giant Giant Sand 
 2012: Tucson; a Country Rock Opera (Fire)

Melted Wires 
 2010 Melted Wires (self-released)

 Howe Gelb 
 2011: Snarl Some Piano (Scatterland)

Filmography 
 "Good Luck Suckers" Giant Sand's concert at the Trabendo in Paris – France 2016
Editing in DVD with the documentary "Sounds of Tucson" – Director Guillaume Dero – La Huit.
 Score for Ingenius (2011) – feature film with Jeremy Renner (Bleiberg Distribution)
 High and Dry:  Where the Desert Meets Rock and Roll (2006) – a documentary about Tucson musicians which includes music and interviews with Giant Sand members
Drunken Bees (1996) – a documentary about Giant Sand by Marianne Dissard.

References

External links
Giant Sand  official website
[ Giant Sand] at Allmusic
 
Official Discography Site
Live Archive
Giant Sand at Fire Records

Alternative rock groups from Arizona
Musical groups from Tucson, Arizona
Rough Trade Records artists
Loose Music artists
Fire Records (UK) artists
Restless Records artists
Thrill Jockey artists
New West Records artists
Homestead Records artists
Yep Roc Records artists